Caladenia applanata subsp. applanata, commonly known as the broad-lipped spider orchid, is a species of orchid endemic to the south-west of Western Australia. It is a relatively common orchid with a single erect, hairy leaf and up to three flowers which may be red, cream, green or yellow and have a broad, flattened, red-tipped labellum.

Description
The sepals have narrow, light brown, club-like glandular tips. Flowering occurs from September to late October. This subspecies differs from subspecies erubescens which has pink flowers.

Taxonomy and naming
Caladenia applanata was first formally described in 2001, Stephen Hopper and Andrew Phillip Brown. Hopper and Brown described two subspecies including the autonym Caladenia applanata subsp. applanata and the description was published in Nuytsia. The specific epithet (applanata) is a Latin word meaning "flattened", referring to the broad labellum.

Distribution and habitat
The broad-lipped spider orchid is found in low heath, often over limestone, in coastal areas between Yallingup and Albany in the Jarrah Forest and Warren biogeographic regions

Conservation
Caladenia applanata subsp. applanata is classified as "not threatened" by the Western Australian Government Department of Parks and Wildlife.

References

applanata
Orchids of Western Australia
Endemic orchids of Australia
Plants described in 2001
Taxa named by Stephen Hopper
Taxa named by Andrew Phillip Brown